The Central European Highlands consist of the high mountains of the Alpine Mountains and the Carpathian Mountains systems and also mountainous ranges of medium elevation (between about  a.s.l.), e.g. those belonging to the Bohemian Massif, still prevailingly of mountainous character.

Both types of mountains act as ”water towers”. Their high elevation brings about high precipitation and low evaporation, and the resulting surplus of water balance feeds large European rivers and other important water sources. Beside the mountains, large areas of Central Europe are occupied by highlands or peneplains of lower altitude in which the surplus of annual water balance is less noticeable.

It includes the uplands of Central Europe and southwestern Europe. Blocks of elevated highlands are found as dissected plateaus and faulted valleys. These are the Meseta plateau of the Iberian Peninsula, the Central massif of France, the highlands of Brittany and south west Ireland, the Rhine highlands, the Vosges, the Black Forest of the Rhine and so on. These are on the map.

References

Further reading
 

Environment of Europe
Natural history of Europe
Mountain ranges of Austria
Mountain ranges of the Czech Republic
Mountain ranges of Hungary
Mountain ranges of Poland
Mountain ranges of Romania
Mountain ranges of Slovakia
Highlands